Kájov is a municipality and village in Český Krumlov District in the South Bohemian Region of the Czech Republic. It has about 1,900 inhabitants.

Administrative parts
Villages of Boletice, Kladenské Rovné, Kladné, Křenov, Lazec, Mezipotočí, Novosedly, Přelštice and Staré Dobrkovice are administrative parts of Kájov.

References

Villages in Český Krumlov District
Catholic pilgrimage sites